Events in the year 1130 in Norway.

Incumbents
 Monarchs – Sigurd I Magnusson (died 26 March); Magnus IV Sigurdsson, Harald IV Magnusson

Events
The death of Sigurd the Crusader in 1130 was followed by a century-long period of civil wars and rivalry for the crown.

Arts and literature

Births

Deaths
26 March – Sigurd the Crusader, King of Norway 1103–1130 (born c. 1090).

References

Norway